Petra Rivers (born 11 December 1952) is a retired Australian athlete who specialised in the javelin throw.

At the 1970 National Championships, she won both the Open and Junior javelin titles.  Still only seventeen, it was her fourth national junior javelin championship win.  Her performances earned her a place in the Australian team for the 1970 Commonwealth Games where she comfortably won the gold medal in Edinburgh.

In late 1971, she threw  Australian and World Junior records of 61.76 and 62.24 metres, in quick succession but injury kept her out of the 1972 national titles and Olympic Games.  She recovered to repeat her Commonwealth Games gold medal win in Auckland but continuing injuries forced her retirement from the sport, at age 22, in 1975.

Four years later, Rivers returned from retirement and gained Olympic selection for the 1980 Moscow Olympics.  She won the 1982 national championships with a huge national record throw of 69.28 metres and took the silver medal at the Brisbane Commonwealth Games behind team-mate Sue Howland.

Rivers went on to compete in the 1984 LA Olympics and 1986 Commonwealth Games.

See also
 Australian athletics champions (Women)

External links
 Petra Rivers at Australian Athletics Historical Results

1952 births
Living people
Olympic athletes of Australia
Australian female javelin throwers
Athletes (track and field) at the 1980 Summer Olympics
Athletes (track and field) at the 1984 Summer Olympics
Commonwealth Games gold medallists for Australia
Commonwealth Games silver medallists for Australia
Commonwealth Games medallists in athletics
Athletes (track and field) at the 1970 British Commonwealth Games
Athletes (track and field) at the 1974 British Commonwealth Games
Athletes (track and field) at the 1982 Commonwealth Games
Athletes (track and field) at the 1986 Commonwealth Games
Medallists at the 1970 British Commonwealth Games
Medallists at the 1974 British Commonwealth Games
Medallists at the 1982 Commonwealth Games